Saimaa is a lake located in the Finnish Lakeland area in southeastern Finland.

The name Saimaa likely comes from a non-Uralic, non-Indo European substrate language.

History

It was formed by glacial melting at the end of the Ice Age. Major towns on the lakeshore include Lappeenranta, Imatra, Savonlinna, Mikkeli, Varkaus, and Joensuu. The event created thousands of square kilometres of new residual wetlands. Following this event, the region saw a population maximum in the decades following only to later return to an ecological development towards old boreal conifer forests which saw a decline in population.

Topography
The Vuoksi River flows from Saimaa to Lake Ladoga. Most of the lake is spotted with islands, and narrow canals divide the lake in many parts, each having their own names (major basins include Suur-Saimaa, Orivesi, Puruvesi, Haukivesi, Yövesi, Pihlajavesi, and Pyhäselkä). Thus, Saimaa exhibits all major types of lake in Finland at different levels of eutrophication.

The number of islands in the region, 14,000, also shows what a maze of detail the system has."

Natural resources

An endangered freshwater seal, the Saimaa ringed seal, lives only at Saimaa.  Another of the lake's endangered species is the Saimaa salmon.

Due to its rich, easily  accessible asbestos deposits, the shores of the lake are the most probable origin of asbestos-ceramic, a type of pottery made between c. 1900 BC – 200 AD.

The areas around Saimaa lake are a very popular location for summer cabins as well as lake cruises.

Saimaa canal
The Saimaa Canal from Lauritsala, Lappeenranta to Vyborg connects Saimaa to the Gulf of Finland. Other canals connect Saimaa to smaller lakes in Eastern Finland and form a network of waterways. These waterways are mainly used to transport wood, minerals, metals, pulp and other cargo, though tourists also use the waterways.

Notable people
 The Russian writer Maxim Gorky went into exile near the shores of Lake Saimaa for a period of time after his apartment was raided by the Black Hundreds in the aftermath of the Moscow Uprising of 1905. He wrote to his divorced wife Ekaterina, writing "it's beautiful here, like a fairy tale".

See also

 Lakes of Finland
 Soisalo

References

External links

www.ymparisto.fi – Saimaa, nimet ja rajaukset 
Visit Saimaa official website, Mikkeli, Savonlinna and Varkaus regions
Saimaa – the heart of Finnish lakeland, from thisisFinland website
Awarded "EDEN – European Destinations of Excellence" non traditional tourist destination 2010

 
Landforms of North Karelia
Landforms of South Karelia
Landforms of South Savo
Landforms of North Savo